Frances Elizabeth Andrews  is a British historian who serves as professor of medieval history at the University of St Andrews. She is a specialist in the medieval church and its networks.

She is the managing editor of Brill's Medieval Mediterranean series and also the series editor for Boydell and Brewer's Studies in the History of Medieval Religion. She was President of the Ecclesiastical History Society (2014–2015).

Her research interests fall into two main areas: medieval Italy and medieval Christianity, with a particular focus on relations between religion and public life, the history of the friars, the Humiliati, and urban history. She is currently writing a monograph on the employment of religious in government and administration.

Beginning in 2019, she led a small team of historians under the aegis of the Royal Historical Society in a new investigation into on the experience of LGBT+ historians and on the teaching of LGBT+ histories in UK universities. She currently coordinates the 'Women Historians of St Andrews' project, which aims to seek out the women who studied, researched and taught history at St Andrews, at any point in time.

Selected publications
The Early Humiliati. 1999.
The Other Friars. 2006.
Doubting Christianity: The Church and Doubt. 2016. (co-edited with Charlotte Methuen and Andrew Spicer)

Publications

 Como and Padua: Andrews, F. E., 22 Aug 2018, Italy and Early Medieval Europe. Papers for Chris Wickham. Balzaretti, R., Barrow, J. & Skinner, P. (eds.). Oxford University Press
 The Sack Friars and the Problems of a Comparative History of the Mendicants: Andrews, F. E., 2017, Gli studi francescani: prospettive di ricerca: Atti dell’Incontro di studio in occasione del 30° anniversario dei Seminari di formazione Assisi, 4-5 luglio 2015. Spoleto: Centro Italiano di Studi sull'Alto Medioevo, p. 147-185 38 p

References

21st-century British historians
Academics of the University of St Andrews
Alumni of the University of London
British medievalists
British women historians
Fellows of the Royal Historical Society
Historians of Italy
Living people
Presidents of the Ecclesiastical History Society
Social historians
Urban historians
Women medievalists
Year of birth missing (living people)